Cepora boisduvaliana is a butterfly in the  family Pieridae. It is found on the Philippines.

Subspecies
The following subspecies are recognised:
Cepora boisduvaliana boisduvaliana (Luzon, Marinduque, Masbate, Mindoro, Panay)
Cepora boisduvaliana semperi Staudinger, 1890 (Basilan, Mindanao, Samar, Ticao)
Cepora boisduvaliana cirta Fruhstorfer, 1910 (Bohol)
Cepora boisduvaliana balbagona Semper 1890 (Camiguin de Mindanao)
Cepora boisduvaliana sibuyanensis Schröder, 1977 (Sibuyan)
Cepora boisduvaliana cebuensis Schroder, 1977 (Cebu)
Cepora boisduvaliana leytensis M.& T.Okano, 1991 (Leyte)
Cepora boisduvaliana negrosensis M.& T.Okano, 1991 (Negros)

References

Pierini
Butterflies described in 1862